FC Desna-2 Chernihiv  is the reserve or second squad of Ukrainian football club Desna Chernihiv or Under 21, from the city of Chernihiv.

FC Desna-2 entered the professional leagues for the first time in 2008. With the recent successes and improvement the senior team has had, the club decided to enter the club into the Druha Liha to give their players more exposure to higher quality competition. Desna-2 had been competing in the Chernihivska Oblast competition and prepared themselves in the fourth-level 2008 Ukrainian Football Amateur League.

Stadium and facilities
The team of the Desna 2 play in the Olympic sports training center "Chernihiv" (formerly Stadion Yuriya Gagarina). The Stadion Yuri Gagarin in Chernihiv was built in 1936 for 3,000 spectators in eastern portion of a city park (garden) that exists since 1804 and where previously was located residence of the Chernihiv Archbishops. The team play also some matches in the Chernihiv Arena, in Tekstylschyk stadium in Lokomotiv stadium and in the Khimik Sport Complex.

Crest
The crest of the club, which was created in early 2008 contained an image of an eagle from the coat of arms of Chernihiv and a sign of Chernihiv prince Mstyslav Volodymyrovych.

Players

Current squad

Notable players

 Oleksandr Konopko
 Teymuraz Mchedlishvili
 Andriy Fedorenko
 Illya Shevtsov
 Yuriy Komyahin
 Dmytro Romanenko
 Oleksandr Roshchynskyi
 Tymur Rustamov
 Ihor Pokarynin
 Yevheniy Belych
 Eduard Halstyan
 Renat Mochulyak
 Denys Demyanenko
 Pavlo Shostka
 Ihor Samoylenko
 Oleksandr Roshchynskyi
 Pavlo Shostka
 Oleh Davydov
 Viktor Lytvyn
 Vladimir Matsuta
 Vladyslav Panko
  Mykola Syrash
  Roman Vovk

Managers
 1985–1994 Oleksandr Sergeevich 
 2004 Andrey Krivenok
 2008 Serhiy Bakun
 2016–2017 Serhiy Bakun
 2017 Oleksandr Datsiuk
 2019 Oleksandr Pyshchur

League and cup history

{|class="wikitable"
|-bgcolor="#efefef"
! Season
! Div.
! Pos.
! Pl.
! W
! D
! L
! GS
! GA
! P
!Domestic Cup
!colspan=2|Europe
!Notes
|-
|align=center|2008
|align=center|4th
|align=center|5
|align=center|8
|align=center|2
|align=center|1
|align=center|5
|align=center|7
|align=center|10
|align=center|7
|align=center|
|align=center|
|align=center|
|align=center|
|}

See also
 List of sport teams in Chernihiv
 FC Desna Chernihiv
 FC Desna-3 Chernihiv
 SDYuShOR Desna
 FC Chernihiv
 Yunist Chernihiv
 Lehenda Chernihiv
 Yunist ShVSM

External links
 Official Site of Desna
 Official Site of Desna 2
 Desna 2 in footballfacts.ru
 WildStat.ru

References

 
FC Desna Chernihiv
Football clubs in Chernihiv
Football clubs in Chernihiv Oblast
Association football clubs established in 2008
2008 establishments in Ukraine
Ukrainian reserve football teams